is a Japanese footballer who plays for Yokohama Takeru FC.

Career statistics

Club

Notes

References

1997 births
Living people
Japanese footballers
Japanese expatriate footballers
Association football defenders
Singapore Premier League players
Albirex Niigata Singapore FC players
Japanese expatriate sportspeople in Germany
Expatriate footballers in Germany
Japanese expatriate sportspeople in Singapore
Expatriate footballers in Singapore